The Light of Western Stars is a 1925 American silent Western film directed by William K. Howard and starring Jack Holt, Billie Dove, and Noah Beery. The film was based on a Zane Grey novel and had been filmed before in 1918.

Plot
As described in a film magazine review, Gene Stewart, a dashing young cowboy who has vowed at the climax of a revel to marry the first young woman he sees on the incoming limited, forces Madeline to go through a marriage ceremony. He is panic stricken when he discovers that she is the sister of his friend Al Hammond. In a shooting affair in El Cajon, Gene assists Al in escaping from the sheriff, and Al asks Gene to look after his sister. Brand, leader of a ruffian band, suddenly learns that the governor has sent the police to clean them out. Madeline is saved during a raid on the ranch from being abducted by Brand when Gene rushes up to the ranch. The outlaws capture Gene and Al. Brand tells Madeline that she must decide whether Gene or her brother will live, the other to take the "walk of death." She selects Gene, but Brand decides to set Al free and kill Gene. Just as this is about to happen, the police after a pitched battle capture the bandits.

Cast

Preservation
With no prints of The Light of Western Stars located in any film archives,<ref>[http://lcweb2.loc.gov/diglib/ihas/loc.mbrs.sfdb.6889/default.html The Library of Congress American Silent Feature Film Survival Catalog: The Light of Western Stars]</ref> it is a lost film.

See also
 An excerpt of the film is seen in the 1931 Paramount promotional film The House That Shadows Built.
 The Light of Western Stars'' (1930)

References

External links

 
 
 Window card (Wayback Machine)

1925 films
Films directed by William K. Howard
Films based on American novels
Films based on Western (genre) novels
Lost Western (genre) films
Paramount Pictures films
1925 Western (genre) films
Films based on works by Zane Grey
American black-and-white films
Lost American films
1925 lost films
Silent American Western (genre) films
1920s American films
1920s English-language films